Gun competition could refer to:
Gun shooting sports in general
The field gun competition of the UK's Royal Navy